Osakücə (also Osaküçə, Asakyudzha, Osakudzha, or Osakyudzha) is a village and municipality in the Lankaran Rayon of Azerbaijan.  It has a population of 6,332.  The municipality consists of the villages of Osakücə, Sinovli, Moloja, Tatova, Pambəyi, and Naftoruon.

References

External links 

Populated places in Lankaran District